The Sultan's Picnic is an album by the Lebanese oud player and composer Rabih Abou-Khalil, fusing traditional Arab music with jazz, which was recorded in 1994 and released on the Enja label.

Reception

The Allmusic review by Kurt Keefner stated "Composer and oudist Rabih Abou-Khalil generates variety and interest by bringing aboard different guest musicians for each album. The personnel on Sultan's Picnic is so similar to that of Blue Camel that one might expect them to sound similar. But there's a key difference in the presence of Howard Levy ... a talented harmonica player who has done a lot of offbeat work ... Despite the power of Charlie Mariano on alto sax and Kenny Wheeler on trumpet, this album is dominated by the idioms of the harmonica, specifically the jazzy, quirky, lackadaisical idiom popularized by Levy's work with the Flecktones".

Track listing
All compositions by Rabih Abou-Khalil
 "Sunrise in Montreal" – 8:14
 "Solitude" – 6:32
 "Dog River" – 4:25
 "Moments" – 6:17
 "Lamentation" – 8:59
 "Nocturne au Villaret" – 6:33
 "The Happy Sheik" – 6:02
 "Snake Soup" – 4:28

Personnel
Rabih Abou-Khalil – oud, bass oud
Howard Levy – harmonica
Kenny Wheeler – flugelhorn, trumpet
Charlie Mariano – alto saxophone
Michel Godard – tuba, serpent
Steve Swallow – bass
Mark Nauseef – drums
Milton Cardona – congas
Nabil Khaiat - frame drums

References

Rabih Abou-Khalil albums
1994 albums
Enja Records albums